Los Bravos were a Spanish beat group, formed in 1965 and based in Madrid. They are most well known for their debut single "Black Is Black" which reached No. 2 in the United Kingdom in July 1966 and No. 4 in the United States (the first Spanish group to do so), selling over a million records worldwide.

Biography
The band was an amalgamation of two pop groups, Los Sonor from Madrid and The Runaways from Mallorca. Los Bravos' lead singer, Mike Kogel, is from Germany. His vocal styling was sometimes likened to Gene Pitney's.  "Black is Black" reached No. 1 in Canada, No. 2 in the UK Singles Chart in July 1966, No. 4 in the US Billboard Hot 100 chart, and has sold over one million copies worldwide.

"Black is Black" was written by Michelle Grainger, Tony Hayes, and Steve Wadey in their recording studio for cutting demo discs in Hoo St Werburgh, near Rochester, Kent, England. The song was later covered by Johnny Hallyday and then by French-based outfit Belle Epoque, whose disco version coincidentally also reached No. 2 in the UK in 1977.

Los Bravos' follow-up single, "I Don't Care", reached No. 16 in the UK in October 1966. In 1967, the band participated in the San Remo Music Festival, failing to qualify for the final with the song "Uno come noi" in Italian. The band was the subject of two Spanish comedic movies: in 1967 Los chicos con las chicas (The Boys With the Girls), directed by Javier Aguirre and in 1968, ¡Dame un poco de amooor...! (Give Me a Little Looove!), directed by José María Forqué and Francisco Macián. Their song "Going Nowhere" from the soundtrack to Los chicos con las chicas was re-issued as a part of the Rhino Records series, Nuggets II: Original Artyfacts from the British Empire and Beyond, 1964–1969. The song had reached No. 55 in Canada.

Their 1968 song "Bring A Little Lovin' " reached No. 22 in Canada, July 13, 1968.

One of Los Bravos' founding members, Manuel Fernández, committed suicide on 20 May 1968, at the age of 23, after the death of his bride, Lottie Rey, in an auto accident. Also that year, Kogel left the group to develop a solo career under the name Mike Kennedy. He was replaced as singer by Bob Wright and then Anthony (Tony) Anderson. Anderson sang with The Warriors, with his brother Jon Anderson, before joining Los Bravos.

In 1975 and 1976, Kogel rejoined the group.

Reunions
In 2004, the group reformed with Pablo Sanllehí, Miguel Vicens Danus and Mike Kogel/Kennedy.

In 2015, Mike Kennedy reunited with Miguel Vicens Danus under the name Los Bravos, to record a new studio version of "Black Is Black." The new recording was officially released on iTunes and edited to create a music video.

In 2019, Miguel Vicens Danus and Pablo Sanllehi inducted Bruce Game as the new lead singer to record a new album. They have released two singles in 2020 followed by four more singles in 2021 on iTunes and Spotify under the name Los Bravos. These include "Gotta Be Strong" and "Chariot".

Miguel Vicens died of pneumonia in Palma on 12 February 2022, at age 78.

Legacy
On 20 March 2019, "Bring a Little Lovin'" by Los Bravos was featured on the soundtrack and first teaser trailer for Once Upon a Time in Hollywood film written and directed by Quentin Tarantino.

Band members
Michael 'Mike' Kennedy (born Michael Volker Kogel, 25 April 1944, Berlin, Germany) — vocals
Anthony 'Tony' Anderson (born 1941, Accrington, Lancashire, United Kingdom) — vocals, harmonica
Antonio Martinez Salas (3 October 1945, Madrid – 19 June 1990, Colmenar Viejo, Spain) — guitar. Martinez died in a motorcycle accident en route to his recording studio.
Manuel Fernández Aparicio (29 September 1943, Seville, Spain – 20 May 1968) — organ
Miguel Vicens Danus (21 June 1943, Ferrol, Galicia – 12 February 2022) — bass guitar
Pablo Sanllehí Gomez (born 5 November 1943, Barcelona, Spain) — drums
Jesús Glück (born Jesús Glück Sarasibar, 1941, Valencia, Spain – 24 January 2018, Madrid) — organ (from 1967)
Ari Leeonx (born, Paris, France) — (1974-75) — vocals
Bruce Game (born Behrouz Ghaemi, 9 March 1980, Qazvin, Iran) — vocals

Discography

See also
RPM number-one hits of 1966
List of artists under the Decca Records label
List of 1960s one-hit wonders in the United States
List of songs deemed inappropriate by Clear Channel following the September 11, 2001 attacks
Music of Spain

Notes

References

External links
 
 
Video for "Black is Black"
Video for "Going Nowhere"

1965 establishments in Spain
1971 disestablishments in Spain
Spanish pop rock music groups
Beat groups
Musical groups established in 1965
Musical groups disestablished in 1971
Decca Records artists
Parrot Records artists
Musical groups from Madrid
English-language singers from Spain